The World Federation of Right to Die Societies is an international federation of associations that promote access to voluntary euthanasia. It holds regular international meetings on dying and death.

The World Federation, founded in 1980, consists of 45 right to die organizations from 25 countries. The Federation provides an international link for organizations working to secure or protect the rights of individuals to self-determination at the end of their lives.

World Right to Die Day 
World Right to Die Day is celebrated November 2 in countries such as France, Italy, Mexico, New Zealand, and Venezuela. The celebration was founded in France at the World Federation Conference in 2008 and has since spread. The participating countries vary in their customs of celebration. This day also falls within the celebration of Dia De Los Muertos in Mexico and is represented in the bigger cities as part of their celebration.

Controversy 
Cases of people choosing assisted suicide programs has been met with some controversy in the media and public. One famous case is that of Brittany Maynard. She was diagnosed with a terminal brain cancer and chose to end her life, but before doing so, she chose to speak out about her situation and her choice, thus opening up the debate about the right-to-die movement in America.

Controversy also lies in issues regarding whether or not the right to die should be granted to those who are in a Minimally Conscious State (MCS). MCS refers to people who have suffered neurological damage and will never fully recover, but still have some awareness.

Groups such as Not Dead Yet fight against the movement to legalize and promote the right to die. They worry that if euthanasia is legalized, seniors and people with disabilities will be pressured against their will into accepting it.

Additionally, controversy has also surfaced amongst right-to-die societies themselves. For example, the well-known organization in the worldwide movement Exit International (www.ExitInternational.net) publisher of the Peaceful Pill Handbook, was granted admission to the World Federation by 2018 but not without some opposition. Within just a few years it had decided not to renew its membership. Tensions appear to lie between societies that advance all options to a reliable, peaceful and painless death such as Exit International and Right to Die Society Canada for example, and most other member societies that only advocate for a medical model regulated by legislation with restrictive eligibility criteria. In keeping with the declared human right that all should have access to assisted dying, the former argue for greater inclusiveness of all persons seeking this remedy even if not gravely ill, while also noting the limitations and exclusions under limited medical assistance in dying (MAiD) in all jurisdictions where it has evolved. Persons preferring not to involve doctors and other professionals in this personal, final act should similarly not be denied knowledge and support without threats of criminal prosecution.

Member Organizations

Africa
 South Africa: Dignity South Africa - Legalise Assisted Dying | my life ~ my choice
 South Africa: SAVES - The Living Will Society
 Zimbabwe: Final Exit Zimbabwe

Asia
 Japan: Japan Society for Dying with Dignity (JSDD)

Europe
 Belgium: Association pour le Droit de Mourir dans la Dignité (ADMD-B)
 Belgium: R.W.S. vzw (Recht op Waardig Sterven vzw)
 Denmark: Landsforeningen En Værdig Død
 Europe: Right to Die Europe, RtD-E
 Finland: EXITUS ry
 France: Association pour le Droit de Mourir dans la Dignité (ADMD-F)
 Germany: Dignitas (Sektion Deutschland) e.V. DIGNITATE, DGHS e.V.
 Ireland: Living Wills Trust (LWT)
 Italy: EXIT - Italia
 Italy: Libera Uscita
 Luxembourg: Association pour le Droit de Mourir dans la Dignité (ADMD-L)
 Netherlands: De Einder
 Netherlands: NVVE, Right to Die - NL
 Norway: Foreningen Retten til en Verdig Død
 Scotland: Friends at the End (FATE)
 Spain: Asociación Federal Derecho a Morir Dignamente (AFDMD)
 Sweden: Rätten Till en Värdig Död (RTVD)
 Switzerland: Dignitas
 Switzerland: EXIT Association pour le Droit de Mourir dans la Dignité (Suisse Romande)
 Switzerland: EXIT-Deutsche Schweiz
 Switzerland: Lifecircle
 United Kingdom: My Death My Decision

North America
 Canada: Association Québécoise pour le Droit de Mourir dans la Dignité (AQDMD)
 Canada: Dying with Dignity
 Canada: Farewell Foundation (ceased to exist circa 2012)
Canada: Right to Die Society of Canada
 United States: AUTONOMY
 United States: Euthanasia Research & Guidance Organization (ERGO)
 United States: Final Exit Network
 United States: Hemlock Society of Florida, Inc
 United States: Hemlock Society of San Diego

Oceania
 Australia: Christians Supporting Choice for Voluntary Euthanasia
Australia: Dying with Dignity NSW
 Australia: Dying with Dignity Queensland
 Australia: Dying With Dignity Tasmania (Inc.)
 Australia: Dying With Dignity Victoria
 Australia: Northern Territory Voluntary Euthanasia Society
 Australia: South Australian Voluntary Euthanasia Society
 Australia: Dying With Dignity Western Australia(Inc)
 New Zealand: End-of-Life Choice Society of New Zealand Inc

South America
 Colombia: Fundacion Pro Derecho a Morir Dignamente (DMD Colombia)
 Venezuela: Derecho a Morir con Dignidad (DMD Venezuela)

See also
Final Exit book by Derek Humphry
Assisted suicide
Compassion & Choices (right-to-die organization)
Death with Dignity National Center
Dignity in Dying
Dignitas
Exit
Final Exit Network
Exit International
My Death, My Decision

References

External links
Official site
Right to Die Europe

Organizations established in 1980
International medical and health organizations
Euthanasia organizations